The  was a general army of the Imperial Japanese Army from 1939 to 1945.

The China Expeditionary Army was established in September 1939 from the merger of the Central China Expeditionary Army and Japanese Northern China Area Army, and was headquartered in the pro-Japanese Reorganized National Government's capital city of Nanking. The China Expeditionary Army was responsible for all Japanese military operations in China and was the main fighting force during the Second Sino-Japanese War, with over 1 million soldiers under its command at its peak. The China Expeditionary Army was dissolved upon the Surrender of Japan in August 1945.

In military literature, the China Expeditionary Army is often referred to by the initials "CEA".

History
After the Lugou Bridge Incident, the Japanese China Garrison Army was reinforced with the Shanghai Expeditionary Army. This force was further supplemented by the Japanese Tenth Army, and marched inland from Shanghai to occupy Hangzhou. In October 1937, this force was renamed the Japanese Central China Area Army. After the fall of Nanking, the Central China Expeditionary Army was formed. On September 12, 1939 by Army Order 362, the China Expeditionary Army was formed with the merger of the Central China Expeditionary Army with the Northern China Area Army. It was headquartered in Nanjing throughout the Second Sino-Japanese War.

The North China Area Army was maintained as a subordinate unit headquartered in Peking and was responsible for operations in the north China plains from the Yellow River to the Great Wall, including Inner Mongolia.

The Japanese Sixth Area Army covered central and southern China, and several independent armies reporting directly to the central command in Nanjing were used for garrison, strategic reserve and for specific operations.

By the war's end it consisted of 1,050,000 men in one armored and 25 infantry divisions. It also contained over 22 Independent brigades; 11 infantry, 1 cavalry, and 10 mixed (combined infantry, artillery, armor and support units). Towards the end of the war much of its ammunition reserve and many of its units had been transferred into the Pacific Theater leaving the China Expeditionary Army weak and undermanned.

The China Expeditionary Army surrendered on August 15, 1945 but its troops remained armed to provide security until Allied troops arrived.

Commanders

Commanding officer

Chief of Staff

See also
 Armies of the Imperial Japanese Army

References

External links

Notes

Military units and formations established in 1939
Military units and formations disestablished in 1945
Army groups of Japan
Expeditionary units and formations
Japanese armies